John Reynolds was  an English Anglican priest in the 17th century.

Reynolds was born in Southampton and educated at Merton College, Oxford.  He was incorporated at Cambridge in 1633. He was Archdeacon of Norwich from 1668 until 1676.

Notes

Clergy from Southampton
17th-century English Anglican priests
Archdeacons of Norfolk
Alumni of Merton College, Oxford